Gowramma is a 2005 Indian Kannada-language romantic comedy film starring Upendra and Ramya in the lead roles. The film was directed by Naganna and produced by Shailendra Babu. The film is a remake of the Telugu film Nuvvu Naaku Nachav. This is the third among a series of successful films under Upendra – Naganna combination. The film also starred Srinivasa Murthy, Doddanna, Ramesh Bhat, Komal, Sadhu Kokila, and Satyajit in supporting roles.

Cast

 Upendra as Venkataswamy alias Venki 
 Ramya as Gowri
 Srinivasa Murthy as Seenu, Father of Gowri
 Doddanna
 Ramesh Bhat as Shekhar 
 Komal as Home chief Bunty 
 Sadhu Kokila as Photographer
 Pavitra Lokesh
 Satyajit
 Ravi Chethan 
 Suneetha Shetty
 Baby Raksha as Pinki 
 Sumanth Shastri as Ashok 
 Rekha Das 
 Mandeep Rai 
 Dr. Nagesh kavati 
 Samrat Rai 
 Shivaji Rao Jadhav 
 B. K. Shankar
 Vijaya Sarathi 
 Myna Chandru

Production
In 2004, Upendra approached Shailendra Babu to remake the 2001 Telugu film Nuvvu Naaku Nachav.

Release and reception

Gowramma received generally positive reviews from critics. Rediff.com praised Upendra's performance in the film and also stated that "Gowramma is an impressively enjoyable film, and a heavily recommended watch". The reviewer for Viggy.com praised the film and Upendra's performance, and stated that he looks different from his stereotype images in films such as A and Upendra. S. N. Deepak of Deccan Herald terms the film "a family entertainer" and commended Ramya's performance while praising the camera-work and dialogues. It was a commercial success at the box office. It made a record collection of Rs.1.25 crores in the first week.

Soundtrack

S.A. Rajkumar scored the music for the film while Upendra and Kaviraj penned the lyrics.

References

2005 films
Indian romantic comedy films
2005 romantic comedy films
Films set in Bangalore
Kannada remakes of Telugu films
Films directed by Naganna
2000s Kannada-language films